The Marine Corps Security Force Regiment is a dedicated security and anti-terrorism unit of the United States Marine Corps. It provides security forces to guard high-value naval installations, most notably those containing nuclear vessels and weapons. It also provides Fleet Anti-terrorism Security Teams (FAST) and Recapture Tactics Teams (RTT). Marines who complete Security Forces training are assigned a secondary Military Occupational Specialty (MOS) of 8152 (Marine Corps Security Force Guard), while instructors can earn 8153 (Marine Corps Security Force Cadre Trainer).

History

The unit was initially organized as the Marine Detachment, Naval Operation Base in 1920. It was re-designated as Marine Barracks, Norfolk in 1939. During World War II, Marines from the Norfolk Barracks provided security for several commands in the Tidewater area, including the Naval Station, Naval Air Station, and Naval Fuel Annex at Craney Island, and what is now Naval Amphibious Base Little Creek. 

The Barracks also acted as the processing center for transient Marines on the East Coast. In addition to providing gate security for the Norfolk Naval Base Complex and a security force for a nearby Service Storage Facility, Barracks Marines also served as ceremonial troops and provided security at the headquarters of United States Atlantic Fleet and provided administrative support to Marines stationed in various Naval commands in Norfolk area.

The Norfolk Barracks was re-designated as Marine Corps Security Force Battalion, Atlantic, on 1 April 1987, and exercised administrative control over security force companies and detachments afloat in the Atlantic region. FAST (FMF LANT) Marines engaged with "intruders" on 14 April 1988 at the fuel farms in Panama during a half hour-long firefight.

The former Marine Barracks at Mare Island Naval Shipyard, Vallejo, CA was re-designated as Marine Corps Security Force Battalion, Pacific, FMF on 3 August 1987. The battalion exercised administrative control over security force companies and detachments afloat in the Pacific region such as the former Marine Barracks Concord, Marine Barracks Bangor, Marine Barracks Hawaii, Marine Barracks North Island, and Marine Barracks Yokusuka, Japan. Originally, Commanding General, Fleet Marine Force, Pacific had direct operational command of MCSFBN, FMF, Pacific. CG FMF PAC visited the battalion at Mare Island near the end of August that year.

The Marine Corps also established FAST Company (Pacific) on 3 August 1987. FAST Marines had participated in the Shallow Hawk 1-87 Riverine Exercise led by US Navy Special Boat Unit-11 a battalion-sanctioned a month earlier in July 1987 prior to the official battalion stand-up. The company comprised five 50-man platoons and assumed responsibility for temporary security of US Navy Nuclear Submarine refueling and defueling (RF/DF) sites; reinforcement of US Navy Nuclear Weapons security facilities; security of transportation of special weapons under contingency operations; and US Navy related nuclear accident-incident (i.e. Broken Arrow and Bent Spear) site security; as well as, reinforcement of US Navy Facilities and US Embassies in the Pacific and Indian Ocean AOR. The first and second platoons were trained and commanded by former guard officers and staff NCO's from Marine Barracks Naval Weapons Station Concord, who were already qualified under Navy Technical Proficiency Inspection (NTPI) standard and had several years experience as nuclear weapons couriers. 

The first operational deployment of a FAST Platoon from MCSFBN (PAC) was 1st Platoon, FAST Company (FMF PAC), on 1 September 1987 to reinforce security at Naval Weapons Station Concord. The second operational deployment of a FAST Platoon from MCSFBN (PAC) was 2nd Platoon, FAST (FMF PAC) to Naval Submarine Base Bremerton Washington in October 1987 for a nuclear fueling security (RF/DF) mission. 1st Platoon also provided RF/DF security for the decommissioning of the  during the fall of 1987 at Mare Island Naval Shipyard. Three of the FAST platoons also participated in KENNEL LANCE BRAVO anti-terrorism exercises with and against US Navy SEALS at several CONUS Naval Bases in the San Diego and Oakland areas. The exercise was terminated with the Loma Prieta earthquake. 1st Platoon, FAST (FMF PAC) also deployed to Naval Station Hawaii during Fall 1988 on an RF/DF mission.

Although the FAST companies (FMF LANT and FMF PAC) were established in 1987 to provide a more mobile force under their respective FMF CG's, the battalions were consolidated and re-organized as Marine Corps Security Force Regiment on 16 December 1993. The new regiment assumed control of all security force companies and detachments globally. In 1998, numerous companies and detachments were deactivated due to force reductions and realignments; two FAST companies were established to take their place.

Units

Active
 Headquarters Company, Naval Weapons Station Yorktown, Yorktown, Virginia 
 Training Company, Naval Support Activity Hampton Roads, Northwest Annex, Chesapeake, Virginia
 Marine Corps Security Forces Battalion Bangor at Naval Base Kitsap, Bangor Trident Base, Washington
 Marine Corps Security Forces Battalion at Naval Submarine Base Kings Bay, Kings Bay, Georgia
 Company at Naval Station Guantanamo Bay, Guantanamo Bay, Cuba
 Company A, Naval Weapons Station Yorktown, Yorktown, Virginia
 Company B, Naval Weapons Station Yorktown, Yorktown, Virginia
 Company C, Naval Weapons Station Yorktown, Virginia
 FAST Company Central, Naval Support Activity Bahrain, Manama, Bahrain
 FAST Company Europe, Naval Station Rota, Rota, Spain
 FAST Company Pacific, United States Fleet Activities Yokosuka, Yokosuka, Japan

Former
 Marine Corps Security Force Regiment, Norfolk, Virginia
 Marine Corps Security Force Battalion, Pacific, Mare Island, California
 (Naval Station Mare Island California FAST Company PACIFIC)
 Naval Air Station North Island, Marine Corps Security Force, Coronado, California
 Naval Air Station Patuxent River, Lexington Park, Maryland
 Naval Air Station Keflavik, Keflavik, Iceland
 Naval Computer and Telecommunications Station Naples, Naples, Italy
 Detachment to Naval Support Activity Suda Bay, Crete, Greece
 Naval Activities United Kingdom, London, United Kingdom
 Naval Security Group Activity Sábana Seca, Puerto Rico
 Naval Station Subic Bay, Olongapo, Philippines
 Concord Naval Weapons Station, Concord, California
 Marine Corps Security Force Company, Naval Air Station Alameda, Alameda, California
 Marine Corps Security Force Company, Naval Air Station Cecil Field, Jacksonville, Florida
 Marine Corps Security Force Company, Naval Weapons Station Earle, Colts Neck, New Jersey

Fleet Anti-terrorism Security Team (FAST) companies

The Fleet Anti-terrorism Security Team (FAST) platoons are capable of rapidly deploying to immediately improve security at United States Government installations worldwide. They are capable of special operations, including advanced close quarters battle and in-extremis hostage rescue. 

Established in 1987, FAST companies provide a limited-duration, expeditionary security force to protect vital naval and national assets. FAST maintains forward-deployed platoons at various naval commands around the globe, and possesses US-based alert forces capable of rapidly responding to unforeseen contingencies worldwide. Each FAST company is equipped and trains with some of the most state-of-the-art weaponry and currently consists of around 500 marines.
 
FAST companies maintain a high degree of readiness in order to conduct these short-notice, limited-duration contingency operations. The USMC's FAST companies provide both the US Navy and Marine Corps with a dedicated force protection and anti-terrorist unit, and they constitute as one of the USMC Special Operations Capable Forces.

History

The late 1970s and early 1980s were a high water mark for US military counter-terrorist efforts. A series of deadly attacks directed at Americans highlighted the requirement for security forces capable of countering terrorist threats against military units. 

The President issued a directive ordering US security agencies and all branches of the military to enhance their capabilities in this field. In compliance with this directive, the USMC conducted a thorough evaluation of its security forces during the mid-eighties. Upon the study's completion, the Corps came to the conclusion that its current security procedures were inadequate to handle the security threats being posed against it. The Corps decided to form a new unit of highly trained marines dedicated to defending both US Navy and Marine Corps assets from terrorist attack. 

The new unit was designated as the Fleet Anti-terrorism Security Team, or FAST. Established in 1987, FAST Companies are equipped to perform security missions as directed by the Chief of Naval Operations. FAST Company marines augment installation security when a threat condition is elevated beyond the ability of resident and auxiliary security forces. They are not designed to provide a permanent security force for the installation. The Marine Corps uses FAST Companies to protect forces when a threat level requires it. 

Each company is well grounded in basic infantry skills. FAST Companies are primarily designed to conduct defensive combat operations, military security operations, and rear area security operations. They also can be tailored for specific tasks from the Chief of Naval Operations. They also ensure nuclear material on submarines is not compromised when the vessels are docked.
 
Dedicated, armed, combat-trained cadre 
Task organized and equipped to perform security missions of short duration 
Augment installation security when the threat condition has been elevated beyond the capability of the permanent security force 
Train installation security forces in anti-terrorism and weapons marksmanship 
Assist the base security officer in the preparation of base defense and other security plans 
Requested by combatant and fleet commanders-in-chief 
Deploy only upon approval of the Chief of Naval Operations

 
Since their inception, FAST Company marines have seen a heavy operations tempo, being deployed to participate in numerous training, security, and combat operations. In 1988, elements of 1st FAST had been deployed to Rodman Naval Station, Panama as a response to a number of incursions by unknown intruders (the intruders were believed to be members of a Cuban special operations unit who were attempting to sabotage US POL stockpiles located on the base). On alternating with US Army security elements, FAST conducted operations including security patrols around the base perimeter, and establishing ambush positions along known avenues of approach. During one incident in April 1988, a Marine Corporal, an 0331 augment from the 2nd Marine Division, was killed by rifle fire during a half-hour long fire-fight with a force of about 30 well-armed intruders, who were suspected to be Cuban special forces. 

The FAST marines were successful in deterring further incursions, and on a number of occasions they took intruders, attempting to gain entry to the base, under fire. On 21 December 1989 the US launched Operation Just Cause, the invasion of Panama. US forces were to secure the country and remove Panamanian military strongman, and the country's de facto leader, from power. Although primarily a US Army, and special operations forces mission, a select number of USMC units were to participate. One of the USMC units selected for the operation was 1st FAST Co.

1st FAST had been operating in Panama for some time providing security at US naval installations; conducting training exercises; and gearing up for any possible terrorist attack directed at USMC or USN facilities in Panama. 1st FAST along with a detachment from the 2nd Light Armored Infantry (LAI) Battalion, another new USMC unit, conducted several joint combat missions together. The 2nd LAI det. provided speed, armored protection, and heavy firepower, while 1 FAST provided CQB skills necessary for operating in the tight confines of an urban environment.

During Operations Desert Storm and Desert Shield, FAST marines provided additional security to US naval installations in Bahrain.

In January 1991, the US Navy and Marines conducted Operation Sharp Edge, the noncombatant evacuation operation of US and foreign nationals from Liberia. FAST was deployed to relieve the Marine Amphibious Readiness Group that was providing security at the US embassy in Monrovia, Liberia.

Shortly after the conclusion of Vigilant Warrior, USCENTCOM found itself involved once again in Somalia, this time to cover the withdrawal of UNOSOM II in accordance with a United Nations decision to pull its forces out of that war ravaged country. After the withdrawal of US forces on 25 March 1994, the United States maintained a liaison office in Mogadishu in an attempt to further the process of political reconciliation in Somalia. Security for this office was provided by a FAST platoon. As conditions in Mogadishu deteriorated, the liaison office relocated to Nairobi and the FAST platoon redeployed to Mombasa, Kenya, on 15 September 1994, with FAST redeploying to home station three days later.

FAST Platoons also provided security support for the transfer of Cuban migrants from Panama holding areas to Guantanamo Bay during Operation Safe Passage from January to February 1995. Following the 1996 bombing of a USAF barracks in Saudi Arabia, FAST marines responded. Elements of FAST Company arrived on the scene and secured several buildings within 10 hours.

During Operation Fairwinds in late 1996, FAST Platoons provided security for Navy Seabees and USAF Civil Engineers, work sites, camp sites, and convoys in Haiti.

Organization

There are currently three FAST companies in the US and a training company. All Companies A,B, and C are located at Naval Weapons Station Yorktown, Yorktown, Virginia. These companies operate under the control of the Marine Corps Security Force Regiment located on Naval Air Station, Norfolk, Virginia, The Security Force Regiment Training Company is located on Naval Support Activity Hampton Roads, Northwest Annex (NSA Northwest), in Chesapeake, Virginia. Each company includes almost 400 marines, task-organized based upon mission.

Training

All Marines assigned to FAST must have completed the following training:

Recruit Training (13 weeks)
SOI (School of Infantry) (8 weeks)
BSG (Security Force Training (6 weeks) - (NSA Northwest, Chesapeake, VA) - Teaches Combat Marksmanship (shotgun and pistol), Close Quarter Battle 
FAST Training (5 weeks)-(NSA Northwest, Chesapeake, VA) Additional training in Advanced Urban Combat.
Close Quarter Battle School - 8 weeks long, RTTs receive this same training as FAST. FAST Platoons have a full squad dedicated to CQB which is a military occupational specialty (MOS 8154). They receive this training at Marine Corps Security Forces Training Company which is an MOS producing school but the whole Platoon will also go through a course known as Advanced Urban Combat or AUC to make sure the entire platoon can be called upon for that very mission if the threat requires it. AUC is a shorter course that is not an MOS producing school. 
BSR Summit Point, West Virginia High performance driving school that teaches, high risk driving, motorcade operations, evasive driving techniques, driving beyond normal limits, ramming, pit, close proximity, driver down and various other driving techniques.
High Risk Personnel also known as executive protection, similar to protective services detail, the military version of Federal Law Enforcement Training Center
Inter-service Nonlethal Individual Weapons Instructor Course and other riot control techniques
Helicopter and Rope Suspension Techniques Master Course, aka H.R.S.T., from Special Operations Training Group: This course focuses on how to properly rappel down structures and out of helicopter, fast rope out of helicopter, use Special Purpose Insertion and Extraction SPIE rigging and how to rig these systems to an aircraft with the proper gear for safe tactical operations.
 
During their training exercises, FAST makes extensive use of simulated ammunition or UTM. Si-munition and UTMs are like paintball ammunition, but it can be fired from weapons normally used by the unit instead of plastic guns. The USMC has seen fit to equip its FAST units with a wide array of weapons, and equipment to help them accomplish their mission. The FAST's arsenal is known to include M4 rifles, M4/M-203 40mm grenade launchers, Modified M-14 rifles with specialized stocks to make them Designated Marksmen Rifles (DMR which has a composite stock and fixed magnification scope) or Enhanced Marksmen Rifle (EMR which has a SAGE stock with a specialized scope known as the Scout Sniper Day Scope or SSDS), Beretta M9A1 9mm pistols, Remington 870 shotguns, Benelli M1014 semi automatic shotgun, M-249 5.56mm Squad Automatic Weapons (SAWs), M-240B 7.62mm MMGs, Browning .50 Cal. HMGs, MK-19 40mm HMGs (automatic grenade launchers). 

All these weapons can at any time be outfitted with the most advanced optics known today like ACOG, EoTech, AimPoint, various PEQ laser systems and night vision scopes. Almost all of FAST Company's missions are unknown, except by the members of that platoon. Charlie FAST Company from NAS Bahrain was sent to secure the embassy in Sanna Yemen in July 2011 just one year prior to the FAST's most recent mission that was known around the world and caught media attention was on 12 September 2012. A FAST team 1 from Rota, Spain was sent to Libya in response to the 2012 US Consulate attack in Benghazi.

Recapture Tactics Team

The Recapture Tactics Team or RTT specializes In-Extremis Hostage Rescue (IEHR) and Nuclear Counter-Proliferation (NCP). RTT units are attached to Nuclear Weapon Stations aboard US naval installations and do not deploy. Where as FAST Platoons deploy to areas in need of naval security operations, RTT has no need to deploy because they are already positioned in the appropriate strategic locations where they are most needed. They constitute one of the USMC Special Operations Capable Forces.

Marines assigned to Naval Nuclear Weapons Stations are given an opportunity, if the Command allows them, to try out for RTT, which is colloquially referred to within the nuclear commands as simply "CQB Platoon," or just "CQB."

Typically, only a small fraction of the marines who are permitted to try out (or “screen”) for the CQB Platoon are actually selected from the grueling 2 week selection process. Those who are selected then have a 4 week long tactical spin-up (a period of intensive preparatory training), in which the CQB Platoon's current Operators help to get the newly selected candidates ready. If they successfully complete the combined 6 week long tryout and spin-up, also known as Assessment and Selection, the RTT candidates then report to USMC CQB School where they undergo an intensive 9 week advanced combat marksmanship and dynamic assault course, during which they are taught In-Extremis Hostage Rescue and Nuclear Counter-Proliferation. The marines and sailors who attend this school learn to violently recapture, or take back by force, United States personnel and property that has been stolen, taken hostage or otherwise compromised.

If they pass the two-month long USMC CQB school, they have officially earned the 8154 MOS, and they then report back to their Naval Nuclear Weapons Command where they spend several more weeks getting "broken in" by the platoon as new Operators. Upon successfully completing that phase, the candidates are formally admitted onto the Recapture Tactics Team.

All RTT marines must attend the following schools to obtain the appropriate certifications:

United States Marine Corps Recruit Training, viz., Boot Camp - 13 weeks long
Marine Corps School of Infantry, Infantry Training Battalion (SOI-ITB) - 14 weeks long
Basic Security Guard (Marine Corps Security Guard Anti-Terrorism Training) - 7 weeks long
Close Quarter Battle School - 9 weeks long (not including platoon Assessment & Selection and the post-Schoolhouse breaking in period.)

And are eligible to attend the following courses, pending their command's approval:

Designated Marksman Course
Methods of Entry or MOE, (small unit demolition and door breaching tactics)

This is not in the pipeline fashion, as it is with other specialty units. RTT receives the "on job training" needed after going to CQB school, before going to the other schools listed.

The Marine Corps Security Forces Regiment's Close Quarters Battle Teams also go to various installations as Mobile Training Teams to teach CQB course to units such as but are not limited to: military police special reaction teams, other military branches (both American and allied), and law enforcement organizations (federal, state, county, local and international/foreign).

See also
 43 Commando Fleet Protection Group Royal Marines
 Marine Security Guard
 Office of Secure Transportation
 Torii for use of symbol on unit logo or patch

References

External links 

 Official website
 profile at GlobalSecurity.org
 MCO P1326.6D SELECTING, SCREENING, AND PREPARING ENLISTED MARINES FOR SPECIAL DUTY ASSIGNMENTS AND INDEPENDENT DUTIES
 Marine Corps Enlisted Job Descriptions: MOS 8154—Marine Corps Security Force (MCSF) Close Quarters Battle (CQB) Team on About.com
 Special Operations.Com's USMC Fleet Antiterrorism Security Team (FAST) page
 FAST Company entry at GlobalSecurity.org
 Rowe, Charles W. "F.A.S.T. is the Way to Go!" The Gun Digest Book of Assault Weapons, 3rd Edition. Jack Lewis, ed. Northbrook, Illinois: DBI Books, 1993. .

Regiments of the United States Marine Corps